Dance Central Spotlight is a music rhythm game developed by Harmonix and published by Microsoft Studios for the Xbox One Kinect.

The game provides a stripped-down experience in comparison to previous Dance Central titles, maintaining the core gameplay of the franchise, but with a focus on providing more routines per-song, the regular release of new, recent songs as downloadable content, and leverage of improvements to the motion detection capabilities of Kinect for Xbox One.

Gameplay 
Similarly to previous installments in the franchise, players must mirror the dance routine of an on-screen dancer, as instructed by "flash cards" indicating specific moves in the routine. Players are judged and scored on the accuracy of their performance. Each song includes up to eight routines, including four difficulty levels of the standard routine, along with two fitness-oriented routines and two "alternate" routines. Additional routines and difficulty levels are unlocked for songs by collecting flash cards by getting "Flawless" ratings on individual moves.

Spotlight includes songs from artists like Rihanna, Lorde and Pharrell Williams. It focuses primarily on the core gameplay of the franchise, with a simplified offering of standard and fitness modes, and no story mode or other minigames like past versions. The practice mode was overhauled to use a dynamic, "on-demand" approach, rather than the "regimented" approach used by previous Dance Central games: players can now jump to training mode in-game by using a voice or controller command. Once activated, the player can practice the relevant portion, slow down the routine, and go to different parts of the song. When the player exits practice, the song continues from where it was left off.

The following ten songs are bundled with the game:

Development and release 
Dance Central Spotlight was unveiled at E3 2014. The overall gameplay of the Dance Central franchise was enhanced by the increased capabilities of the Xbox One Kinect sensor, which has a higher resolution camera and better gesture recognition than the Xbox 360 iteration. In total, the game can recognize more than 7,000 different dance moves. Harmonix director Matthew Nordhaus also teased the presence of tougher alternate routines for individual songs, aimed particularly at expert players. Harmonix co-founder Alex Rigopulos felt that Microsoft's introduction of lower-cost Xbox One bundles excluding Kinect wasn't a "shock" and the bundling of Kinect with Xbox One on launch did not influence the development of Spotlight in any way.

Unlike previous installments in the franchise, Spotlight places a heavy emphasis on downloadable content and the ability for players to purchase songs on an À la carte basis; Nordhaus noted that due to improvements in motion capture technology and the need to perform fewer QA tests because of the improved Kinect accuracy (specifically noting the need to do large levels of tuning for hand detection on the Xbox 360 version), Harmonix staff could produce new routines for the game in just "days" rather than months. Emphasizing that players wanted to have quicker in-game access to current hit music, Nordhaus stated that Harmonix would now be able to release new songs as DLC while they are still charting.

Dance Central Spotlight was officially released on September 2, 2014; unlike other installments in the series, the game is only available via digital means. The base game includes 10 songs; new songs for the game were released on a near-weekly basis for a "substantial" period of time. A pre-paid code to download Spotlight is also included with standalone Kinect for Xbox One units, which were released on October 7, 2014.

On March 8, 2015, Nisha and Claptrap (despite his lack of legs and using a wheel) from the Borderlands franchise were added as bonus characters via cheat codes; Harmonix had assisted in animating portions of a trailer for Borderlands: The Pre-Sequel! (which was being re-released for Xbox One later that month alongside a port of Borderlands 2, as part of Borderlands: The Handsome Collection).

Legacy downloadable content 
All DLC from previous Dance Central games were ported to Spotlight—they were re-released progressively in batches following the game's release. The ported DLC include their standard routines from the original version (including the Beginner routine from Dance Central 3 for Dance Central 1 and Dance Central 2 songs) (Easy routines are labeled as Standard, Normal routines are labeled as Deluxe and Hard routines are labeled as Pro) (with additional set of dance moves not seen in the original version for Dance Central 1 songs, creating four entirely new routines that are remakes from those from the original routines, replacing the Freestyle section, which is togglable), along with two fitness-oriented routines and two "alternate" routines, as with Spotlight-specific songs, all of which are brand new. Songs that were previously purchased on the Xbox 360 versions of Dance Central games can be re-downloaded on Spotlight at no extra charge.

Dance Central Spotlight downloadable content

Reception 

GameSpot gave Spotlight an 8 out of 10, praising its cleaner interface and dropping of extraneous features for "[removing] the obstacles between you and just getting out there and dancing", and its new business model as a "tremendous value" for players. However, its minimalistic feedback for player performance was considered a double-edged sword due to the new unlock system's emphasis on rewarding the learning of individual moves.

Notes

References

External links

2014 video games
Dance video games
Kinect games
Music video games
Video game sequels
Video games developed in the United States
Xbox One games
Xbox One-only games
Harmonix games